China–Russia relations, are the international relations between the People's Republic of China and the Russian Federation. Diplomatic relations between China and Russia improved after the dissolution of the Soviet Union and establishment of the Russian Federation in 1991. American scholar Joseph Nye states:

The two countries share a land border which was demarcated in 1991, and they signed the Treaty of Good-Neighborliness and Friendly Cooperation in 2001, which was renewed in June 2021 for five more years. On the eve of a 2013 state visit to Moscow by Chinese leader Xi Jinping, Russian President Vladimir Putin remarked that the two nations were forging a special relationship. The two countries have enjoyed close relations militarily, economically, and politically, while supporting each other on various global issues. Commentators have debated whether the bilateral strategic partnership constitutes an alliance. Russia and China officially declared their relations 'Not allies, but better than allies'.

Country comparison 

Leaders of China and Russia from 1991
General Secretary of the Chinese Communist Party
President of the Russian Federation

History

The relations between China and Russia go back to the 17th-century, when the Qing dynasty tried to drive Russian settlers out of Manchuria, ended by the signing of the Treaty of Nerchinsk. During the Cold War, China and the USSR were rivals after the Sino-Soviet split in 1961, competing for control of the worldwide Communist movement. There was a serious possibility of a major war between the two nations in the early 1960s; a brief border war took place in 1969. This enmity began to lessen after the death of Chinese Communist Party chairman Mao Zedong in 1976, but relations were poor until the fall of the Soviet Union in 1991.

On December 23, 1992, Russian President Boris Yeltsin made his first official visit to China, where he met with CCP general secretary Jiang Zemin and Chinese president Yang Shangkun. In December 1996, at the end of Chinese Premier Li Peng’s visit to Moscow, Russia and China issued a joint communique pledging to build an "equal and reliable partnership." This reinforced the China-Russian view that the United States was their main competitor in the global political scene. 

In 2001, the close relations between the two countries were formalized with the Treaty of Good-Neighborliness and Friendly Cooperation, a twenty-year strategic, economic, and – controversially and arguably – an implicit military treaty. A month before the treaty was signed, the two countries joined with junior partners Kazakhstan, Kyrgyzstan, Tajikistan, and Uzbekistan in the Shanghai Cooperation Organisation (SCO). Still active as of 2022, the organization is expected to counter the growing influence of the United States military outreach program in Central Asia. The PRC is currently a key purchaser and licensee of Russian military equipment, some of which have been instrumental in the modernization of the People's Liberation Army. The PRC is also a main beneficiary of the Russian Eastern Siberia – Pacific Ocean oil pipeline.

When China attempted to build closer relations with Russia in 2013, the Russian government initially had reservations. However, the United States sanctions against Russia for its 2014 annexation of Crimea helped push Russia to a warmer relationship with China.

Liam Carson, an emerging European economist at Capital Economics, said in 2019:

By 2019, both nations had serious grievances with the United States. For China, the issues were control of the South China Sea, trade policies, and technology policy. For Russia, the main issue was severe economic penalties imposed by the U.S. and Europe to punish its seizure of Crimea from Ukraine. China and Russia do, however, differ on some policies. China does not recognize Russia's annexation of Crimea, and Russia does not support China's claims in the South China Sea. Nevertheless, China and Russia currently enjoy the best relations they have had since the late 1950s. Although they have no formal alliance, the two countries do have an informal agreement to coordinate diplomatic and economic moves, and build up an alliance against the United States. Yaroslav Trofimov, the chief foreign-affairs correspondent of The Wall Street Journal, argued in 2019:

Russian invasion of Ukraine 

Xi and Putin met on February 4, 2022, during the run up to the 2022 Beijing Olympics during the massive Russian build-up of force on the Ukrainian border, with the two expressing that the two countries are nearly united in their anti-US alignment and that both nations shared "no limits" to their commitments. Western Intelligence reports said that China had asked Russia to wait to invade Ukraine until after the Beijing Olympics ended on February 20. Shortly before the invasion, Chinese media would repeat Russian statements that Russia's troops were being pulled away from the border with Ukraine.

On February 22, two days prior to the invasion of Ukraine, a leaked post The Beijing News' Horizon News on Weibo detailed instructions on how to report on a crisis in Ukraine; the post asked editors to monitor unfavorable comments, to only use tags shared by Chinese state media and stated "Do not post anything unfavorable to Russia or pro-Western. Let me review your words before posting". On February 25, 2022, one day following the Russian invasion of Ukraine, Putin told Xi during a phone call that Russia is eager to engage in high-level negotiations with Ukraine, according to China's foreign ministry.

China refused to condemn the Russian invasion of Ukraine, repeated Russian propaganda about the war, opposed economic sanctions against Russia, and abstained or sided with Russia in UN votes on the war in Ukraine.

In 2022, Russia added Taiwan to a list of foreign states and territories that commit "unfriendly actions" against its military invasion of Ukraine. Chinese leader Xi Jinping has assured Vladimir Putin of China's support on Russian “sovereignty and security” in May.

In April 2022, in an interview with the Italian newspaper Corriere della Sera, Russian political scientist Sergey Karaganov, who is considered close to Vladimir Putin, said that Russia "will be more integrated and more dependent on China", further stating that "Chinese are our close allies and friends and the biggest source of Russian strength after Russian people themselves."

In June 2022, Chinese Communist Party leader Xi Jinping had a call with Putin where he reaffirmed support for Russia on security issues while saying that "all parties should responsibly push for a proper settlement of the Ukraine crisis".

Ukrainian president Volodymyr Zelenskyy said that China has the economic leverage to pressure Putin to end the war, adding "I’m sure that without the Chinese market for the Russian Federation, Russia would be feeling complete economic isolation. That’s something that China can do – to limit the trade [with Russia] until the war is over." In August 2022, Zelenskyy said that since the beginning of the war in Ukraine, CCP general secretary Xi Jinping had refused all his requests for direct talks with him.

In February 2023, Putin's spokesperson Dmitry Peskov rejected the Chinese peace proposal, saying that "for now, we don't see any of the conditions that are needed to bring this whole story towards peace."

In March 2023, Politico reported that Chinese state-owned weapons manufacturer Norinco shipped assault rifles, drone parts, and body armor to Russia between June and December 2022, with some of the shipments going through via third-countries including Turkey and the United Arab Emirates.

Border

On May 29, 1994, during the visit of Russian Prime Minister Viktor Chernomyrdin to Beijing, Russian and Chinese officials signed an agreement on the Sino-Russian Border Management System intended to facilitate border trade and hinder criminal activity. On September 3 of that year, a demarcation agreement was signed, fixing the boundary along a previouslydisputed 55-km stretch of the western Sino-Russian border. After the final demarcation carried out in the early 2000s, it measures , and is the world's sixth-longest international border.

The 2004 Complementary Agreement between the People's Republic of China and the Russian Federation on the Eastern Section of the China–Russia Boundary stated that Russia agrees to transfer a part of Abagaitu Islet, all of Yinlong (Tarabarov) Island, about a half of Bolshoy Ussuriysky Island, along with some adjacent islets, to China. A border dispute between Russia and China, standing since Japanese invasion of Manchuria of 1931, was thus resolved. These Amur River islands were, until then, administered by Russia and claimed by China. The event was meant to foster feelings of reconciliation and cooperation between the two countries by their leaders. The transfer has been ratified by both the Chinese National People's Congress and the Russian State Duma. The official transfer ceremony occurred on-site on October 14, 2008.

Rival claims over Vladivostok settled 

In 2005, Beijing and Moscow ratified an agreement that ended more than three and half centuries of their struggle over territory and for dominance.

Economic relations

Economic relations between Russia and China demonstrate mixed trends. Trade between the two countries was running between $5 billion and $8 billion per year in the 1990s, but grew steadily from then onwards. It was on course to hit $100 billion – the previous goal – until the 2008 crisis interceded. Trade slumped back to around $60 billion in 2015 and 2016 but started to recover again in 2017. Both countries are expecting to raise the trade volume to $200 billion by 2024.

Between 2008 and 2009, when Russia experienced a financial crisis, there was a sharp increase in borrowing from China. This trend, however, did not last. Starting in 2013, borrowing started to grow steadily.

The main form of cooperation in the complex economic relations between Russia and China is trade. From 2003 until 2013, mutual trade increased 7.7 times; in 2014 the scale of bilateral operations increased even more. The aggravation of relations between Russia and Western countries contributed to the expansion of economic ties with China. By 2020, the parties planned to increase bilateral trade to $200 billion. According to the Federal Сustoms Service (FCS) of the Russian Federation, in 2016 the foreign trade turnover of Russia and China amounted to $66.1 billion (in 2015 – $63.6 billion). Russia has a negative trade balance with China: in 2016 exports amounted to 28 billion, whereas imports totaled 38.1 billion (in 2015, 28.6 and 35.9 billion, resoectively). The share of China in foreign trade with Russia grew from 12.1% in 2015 to 14.1% in 2016. Since 2010, China is the largest trading partner of Russia.

Most of Russia's exports to China originate from the mining and petrochemicals sectors. More than half of Russia's exports to China come from mineral fuels, oil, and petroleum products (60.7%), followed by wood and wood products (9.4%), non-ferrous metals (9%), fish and seafood (3.5%), and chemical products (3.3%). The main categories of imports to Russia from China are machinery and equipment (35.9%), clothing (13.7%), chemical products (9.1%), fur and fur products (5.6%), footwear (5.3%), and furniture (3%). According to the General Сustoms Administration of China, bilateral trade in January–May 2017 increased by 26.1% in annual terms, amounting to $32.3 billion, and mutual trade in 2017 may exceed $80 billion According to the Ministry of Commerce of China, as of January 1, 2016, the volume of accumulated direct Russian investments in China amounted to $946.9 million and Chinese investments totaled ten times more, estimated at $8.94 billion.

Participation in such organizations as BRICS and RIC (Russia-India-China) has significant importance for Russian-Chinese economic relations. At the Russian-Chinese summit held in Shanghai, Vladimir Putin and Xi Jinping stressed that "Russia and China stand for the transformation of BRICS into a mechanism of cooperation and coordination on a wide range of global financial, economic and international political problems, including the establishment of a closer economic partnership, the early establishment of the BRICS development Bank and the formation of a; for the expansion of joint efforts of representation and voting rights of States with emerging markets and developing countries in the system of global economic governance, for the formation of an open world economy; for the deepening of cooperation in the field of foreign policy, including in the settlement of regional conflicts". 

To facilitate financial transactions in the regions, China and Russia will conduct a currency swap. Central banks, with whom China has signed currency swaps, are able to issue loans to their banks in yuan. A currency swap agreement was signed with Russia in the amount of 150 billion yuan ($25 billion). Currency swaps will make the ruble and the yuan more stable, which in turn will have a positive impact on the stability of the global financial system. Additionally, the expansion of currency trading may facilitate investment processes. By investing in an economy that is now facing certain problems due to the fall of the ruble and oil prices, China is carrying out soft expansion and supports one of its main partners. China and Russia have long advocated reducing the role of the dollar in international trade, and both aim to create conditions for the development of bilateral trade and mutual investment. The rate of de-dollarization chosen by the countries is due to the rapid growth of the RMB's share in international payments and settlements (Oct. 2013. – 0.84%, Dec. 2014. – 2.17%, Feb. 2015. – 1.81%). The conclusion of a currency swap makes it possible to facilitate payments, as there is an imitation of the internal currency, which speeds up the transfer procedure and minimizes the cost of conversion.

In 2013, China initiated the creation of a new economic initiative – the "New silk road" or the Belt and Road Initiative. This project is designed primarily to strengthen economic ties and cooperation and to attract investors from Asia and other parts of the world to actively participate in the creation of the "silk road economic belt of the XXI century". The zone should extend from China to Europe through Central Asia and Russia, as it is an important  transit  logistical  link  between  China and Europe, in which the Asian Infrastructure Investment Bank may play a significant role. In recent years, China and Russia have stepped up cooperation in the construction of cross-border infrastructure. New Eurasian transport routes are being built as well, including the "Chongqing-Xinjiang-Europe" railway and the "Western Europe – Western China" route, which will pass through Russia. In northeast China and the Russian far East, both countries are actively promoting the construction of bridges, ports, and other projects. It is planned to increase the volume of bilateral trade between China and Russia to $200 billion by the end of 2020.

Russia has also shown interest in cooperating with the countries of the Eurasian Economic Union (EAEU). The creation of the EAEU is posed to serve as an important platform for multilateral cooperation in the region, as all participants are friendly neighbors and partners with Russia, as well as traditional partners with China. Russia is interested in creating a free trade zone of the EAEU and China, as well as the use of the national currency in this region.

Following the implementation of international sanctions during the Russo-Ukrainian War, China provided economic relief to Russia. China's total trade with Russia was a record $190 billion in 2022. In the same year, China accounted for 40% of Russia's imports.

Trade in national currencies
On November 23, 2010, at a meeting of Russian Prime Minister Vladimir Putin and the Chinese Premier Wen Jiabao, it was announced that Russia and China have decided to use their own national currencies for bilateral trade, instead of the U.S. dollar. The move was aimed to further improve the relations between Beijing and Moscow and to protect their domestic economies during the financial crisis of 2007–2008. The trading of the Chinese yuan against the Russian ruble started in the Chinese interbank market, while the yuan's trading against the ruble started on the Russian foreign exchange market in December 2010.

In coordination with other emerging economies, the 2010 BRIC summit was held in Brasília in April 2010.

In 2014, Beijing and Moscow signed a 150 billion yuan central bank liquidity swap line agreement to avoid and counter American sanctions.

In December 2014, Chinese Foreign Minister Wang Yi pledged to offer financial support to Russia and support the Ruble, if needed, in light of the currency's depreciation.

Russia's dependence on the Chinese yuan increased heavily after its invasion of Ukraine in 2022. The share of Russian exports paid in yuan rose to 16% by December 2022, compared to 0.4% before the invasion, while share of imports paid in yuan increased to 23%, up from 4% before. Yuan's share of stock market trading in Russia increased from 3% to 33% Nearly 50 financial institutions were offering yuan saving accounts by 2023, and households were holding around $6 billion worth of yuan in Russian banks by the end of 2022.

Tourism & cultural exchanges

Tourism, especially from China to Russia, has seen a massive spike over the years. More than 2 million Chinese tourists visited Russia in 2019, compared to 158,000  a decade ago. China is one of the most important tourist markets for Russia. Support for cooperation between Russian and Chinese investment organizations in tourism industry is provided in the context of the Joint Action Plan by the Russian Federal Agency for Tourism and China's State Administration of Tourism. More than 2.3 million Chinese tourists flew into Moscow's Sheremetyevo – Alexander S. Pushkin international airport in 2019, including 1.26 million who transferred via the airport. Sheremetyevo, which offers flights to 29 Chinese cities served by eight Chinese airlines, expects their number to grow by 30 per cent a year in the years to come. Russia has played into this tourism boom by expanding capacity of Moscow's largest airport. “Russia has also allowed more flights from regional Chinese air companies to Moscow, which helps to turn the Russian capital into an air hub for Europe-bound Chinese tourism.” Sheremetyevo is looking to capitalise on that growth. Pǔtōnghuà or standard Chinese is among the languages displayed on Sheremetyevo's signs and announcements, while duty-free stores accept popular Chinese payment methods, including UnionPay cards and online systems WeChat Pay and Alipay. As many as 70 per cent of tax-free receipts handed out at Russia's airports go to Chinese citizens. By 2019, Russia has become among the top 3 travel destinations for Chinese tourists.

Energy relations

Since the dissolution of the USSR in 1991, energy relations between China and Russia have been generally marked by cooperation and regard for mutual geopolitical and strategic interests. China's fast-growing economy places increasing pressure on itself to secure energy imports, while Russia's economy is largely driven by the demand for the export of natural resources. China became a petroleum importer for the first time in 1993, had become the world's second-largest oil-consuming country as of 2011, and the world's largest overall energy consumer as of 2010. In a report released in January 2012, the China Petroleum and Chemical Industry Federation estimated that the country's crude oil consumption would increase to 480 million tonnes in 2012, or 9.6 million barrels per day. The group also forecast that natural gas consumption would rise 15.3 percent to 148.2 billion cubic meters (bcd). Given its geographical proximity to China and position as one of the world's largest oil producers and natural gas exporters, Russia has been an obvious candidate for meeting this increased demand. While energy relations have primarily related to oil, gas, and coal, there have also been partnerships with regard to nuclear and renewable (wind and water) energy technology.

From the mid-1990s, when the tightening of global energy markets coincided with his rise to power, Russian President Vladimir Putin has signaled the importance of, oil and particularly natural gas, for Russia's emergence as a global power. Long-term prospects for Russian gas exports to China will be affected by several global pricing trends. Surges in liquefied natural gas (LNG) capacity, the increasingly competitive nature of Central Asian gas supplies, advances in shale gas technology, and potential greenhouse gas policies may all impact Chinese consumption.

Despite frequent declarations of goodwill and bilateral energy cooperation, Chinese-Russian energy relations since 1991 have been limited by mutual suspicions, pricing concerns, inadequate transportation infrastructure, and competition for influence in Eurasia.

In 2014, Russia and China signed a 30-year gas deal worth $400 billion. Deliveries to China started in late 2019. The Power of Siberia pipeline is designed to reduce China's dependence on coal, which is more carbon intensive and causes more pollution than natural gas. For Russia, the pipeline allows another economic partnership in the face of resistance to the Nord Stream 2 pipeline. The proposed western gas route from Russia's West Siberian petroleum basin to North-Western China is known as Power of Siberia 2 (Altai gas pipeline).

In 2022, China's imports of discounts of up to 30% oil from Russia rose 55% in May, Russia displaced Saudi Arabia as China's biggest oil provider in recent months.

History
The official relationship between the People's Republic of China and the Russian Federation has been upgraded three times since the establishment of diplomatic relations in 1991. Beginning as “good-neighborly and mutually beneficial” in December 1992, it evolved into a “constructive partnership” in September 1994, and finally a “strategic partnership of coordination” in April 1996.  In September 1999, the two countries began joint construction of a nuclear power station at Lianyungang, Jiangsu Province with an installed capacity of 2 million kW, one of the first situations of mutual energy cooperation.

The late 1990s also marked the beginning of feasibility studies for natural gas and oil pipeline projects in Western and Eastern Siberia. In 2001, Russian company Yukos proposed the unprecedented Eastern Siberia-Pacific Ocean (ESPO) Oil Pipeline Project, which would link Yukos's oil refinery in Angarsk to Daqing, in northern China. At the time, rail routes were the only means of transporting oil into the growing Chinese market. The project stalled in October 2003 when Yukos chief executive Mikhail Khodorkovsky was arrested on charges including tax evasion and fraud, and the Russian government launched an immediate investigation into the company. Many speculated that the series of events were politically motivated, given that Mr. Khodorkovsky had been a vocal opponent of President Putin.  A week after Mr. Khodorkovsky's arrest, China Foreign Ministry spokeswoman Zhang Qiyue publicly announced that the Kremlin investigation would not impact the proposed China-Russia oil pipeline project.

In September 2004, Chinese premier Wen Jiabao met with Russian Prime Minister Mikhail Fradkov in Moscow, where the two heads of government signed agreements affirming Russia's promise to set the route of a proposed pipeline from Eastern Siberia to the Pacific, with priority given to laying a pipeline spur to China, as well as increasing rail oil exports to China to 10 million tons (200,000 b/d) in 2005 and 15 million tons (300,000 b/d) in 2006. Four days before Wen's visit, Yukos, then the largest supplier of Russian oil to China and Russia's biggest oil producer, publicly announced that rail shipments of crude oil to the China National Petroleum Corporation (CNPC) would end beginning on September 28, 2004. The Kremlin had begun auctioning off the troubled company's operating assets a month prior in August.

Gazprom, Soyuzneftegaz and the Chinese Embassy in Moscow all expressed interest in Yuganskneftegaz, a main arm of Yukos. The subsidiary was ultimately acquired by Russia's state-owned oil company Rosneft for roughly $9.3 billion. In February 2005, Russian Finance Minister Alexei Kudrin revealed that Chinese banks provided $6 billion in financing the Rosneft acquisition. This financing was reportedly secured by long-term oil delivery contracts between Rosneft and the CNPC. In the same month, the Chinese Foreign Ministry denied that China provided "funds" for the deal. The Foreign Ministry could not confirm whether there were any "loans" involved, ministry spokesman Kong Quan said.

State-owned Lukoil became China's largest Russian oil supplier when CNPC reached a strategic cooperation agreement with the company in September 2006. In the same month, CNPC agreed to a set of principles establishing future joint ventures with Rosneft.

In 2006, Gazprom was made responsible for all exports of gas from Russia's eastern Siberian fields, outside of sales made through production sharing agreements (PSAs). This was another move widely seen to be politically motivated, since successful commercial development of these fields and export to Asian markets would be impossible without Gazprom – and therefore Kremlin – involvement. In an annual shareholder report two years prior, Gazprom acknowledged a plan for supplying natural gas to China. Two routes, roughly equal in capacity, would be constructed, with a total volume of 68 billion cubic meters of gas per annum. An Altai pipeline would link West Siberian fields with the Xinjiang Uyghur Autonomous Region in western China, while the eastern pipeline would run from Yakutia into northeastern China.

Chinese domestic natural gas consumption roughly matched domestic production in 2004. Since then, however, its rate of growth and more sustainable energy profile compared to oil inevitably led to a surge in Chinese natural gas imports. In March 2006, CNPC signed a memorandum of understanding (MOU) with Gazprom for the delivery of natural gas to China, which officially began pricing negotiations between Gazprom chief executive Alexei Miller and Chen Geng, then head of the CNPC. In September 2007, the Russian Federation Industry and Energy Ministry approved a development plan for an integrated gas production, transportation, and supply system in Eastern Siberia and the Far East, taking into account potential gas exports to China and other Asia-Pacific countries. Gazprom was appointed by the Russian Government as the Eastern Gas Program execution coordinator.

Russia's desire to diversify its export markets has been matched by China's willingness to invest in Russian energy production and infrastructure. Russian policymakers, however, have expressed reserve about increased Chinese influence in the energy sector. In 2002, CNPC attempted to bid for Russian oil firm Slavneft, but withdrew just weeks later. International news sources suggested the bid failed partly due to anti-foreign sentiment in the Duma, Russia's lower parliamentary house. Slavneft was privatized by parity owners TNK (later OAO TNK-BP) and Sibneft (later OAO Gazprom Neft) soon afterwards. In 2004, Slavneft was then acquired by TNK-BP, the product of a merger between the Alfa Access Renova Consortium (AAR, Alfa Group) and British Petroleum (BP). In 2006, Russia denied CNPC a significant stake in OAO Rosneft. When the Russian company went public, CNPC was allowed to purchase $500 million worth of shares, one-sixth of the $3 billion it had sought. The financial crisis triggered in 2008 gave China its opportunity to invest in Russia on a grander scale through a loans for oil program. In 2009 and 2010, China's long-term energy-backed loans (EBL) extended large sums of capital to companies and entities not only in Russia, but also in Brazil, Ecuador, Turkmenistan and Venezuela.

Growing Chinese investment is speculated to be about more than energy security for China. Chinese news agency Xinhua reported in 2010 that many Chinese enterprises believe the Russian market will allow them to become truly global. Gao Jixiang, Associate Research Fellow of the Russian Economy Research Office of the Russia, East Europe, and Central Asia Research Institute of the Chinese Academy of Social Sciences, reported that China's investments in Russia totaled $1.374 billion as of 2007, and were projected to reach $12 billion by 2020. In 2008–09 alone, total investments rose 25.4% to $2.24 billion and direct investment went from $240 million to $410 million.
 
2009 marked the 60th anniversary of established diplomatic relations between Moscow and Beijing, and also coincided with the signing of over 40 contracts worth roughly $3 billion. Chinese leader Hu Jintao and President Dmitry Medvedev of Russia conferred three times in four days during mid-June at the Shanghai Cooperation Organisation summit in Yekaterinburg, at the first-ever heads-of-state meeting of the BRIC countries (Brazil, Russia, India, and China), and again when Hu made a state visit to Moscow from June 16–18, representing what many saw to be a high-water mark in Chinese-Russian relations.

Growing economic closeness also seemed to suggest a growing political alliance. A joint statement released by the two heads of state expanded upon how the two governments usually pledge mutual support for their sovereignty and territorial integrity. The Russian government explicitly affirmed that Tibet, along with Taiwan, are "inalienable parts of the Chinese territory", while the Chinese supported "Russia's efforts in maintaining peace and stability in the region of Caucasus." During Hu's visit, however, Gazprom announced it could not begin delivering natural gas to China in 2011 as planned because of pricing disagreements. Construction of the Western Siberian Altai pipeline, which could deliver over 30 billion cubic meters of natural gas annually to China, was originally scheduled to begin in 2008.

September 27, 2010 marked the completion of the  Russia-China Crude Pipeline. Stretching from Russia's Skovorodino station to China's Mohe station, it was the first pipeline ever built between China and Russia. In April 2009, Rosneft and Transneft had signed deals with CNPC guaranteeing the pipeline's production of 300,000 barrels of crude oil per day for twenty years as part of a $25 billion loan-for-oil agreement. Upon the pipeline's completion in 2010, CNPC also signed a general agreement with Transneft over the operation of the pipeline, a framework agreement with Gazprom to import natural gas to China from 2015 onwards, an agreement with Rosneft on extending oil supply to the Russia-China Crude Pipeline, and an agreement with Lukoil on expanding strategic cooperation. Both sides hailed the series of agreements as a "new era" in cooperation, and Russia's Deputy Prime Minister Igor Sechin told reporters in Beijing that Russia was "ready to meet China's full demand in gas" going forward.

In September 2010, President Putin reaffirmed the potential nuclear future of Russia and China's energy relations, saying "Of course, our cooperation with China is not limited to just hydrocarbons ... Russia is China's main partner in the field of peaceful use of nuclear energy, and equipment supplies here amount to billions of dollars". As of 2011, however, Russian officials have remained reluctant to transfer nuclear energy technologies and other knowledge products to Chinese partners. Industry experts have pointed out that while proprietary technology would protect Russian exports from being displaced by lower-cost Chinese products in third-party markets, such an approach may reinforce Chinese doubts about Russia's reliability as a long-term energy partner.

The Russian oil industry has not only been burdened by corporate struggles such as with Yukos and political disagreements between the countries, but also by the reoccurring breaches in safety.  Some difficulties stem from the Kazakh riots to endless environmental concerns, but most recently the capsizing of an oil platform that was allowed to operate in the north late in the season, while towed under adverse maritime conditions. Incidents such as these cannot help but give potential foreign investment, which the region needs, pause as to the reliability of Russian energy supplies.

Russian Far East (RFE)
In 1996, the Russian Federation completed two production sharing agreements (PSA) for oil and gas exploration off the northeast coast of the Sakhalin Islands. The Sakhalin-I project, operated by Exxon Neftegas Limited (ENL), has estimated potential recoverable reserves at 307 million tons of oil (2.3 billion bbn) and 485 billion cubic meters of gas as of 2002.  ENL, a subsidiary of US-based ExxonMobil, holds a 30 percent interest in the project, while Rosneft holds 20 percent via its affiliates RN-Astra (8.5 percent) and Sakhalinmorneftegas-Shelf (11.5 percent). Japanese consortium SODECO and the Indian state-owned oil company ONGC Videsh Ltd. holds the remaining 50 percent (30 and 20 percent, respectively).

The Sakhalin-II project is managed by the Sakhalin Energy Investment Company Ltd. (Sakhalin Energy). As of 2011, Russian state monopoly Gazprom holds 50% plus 1 share, RoyalDutch Shell 27.5%, Mitsui 12.5% and Mitsubishi 10%. Gazprom purchased its majority stake from Sakhalin-2 operator Royal Dutch Shell in 2006. The project had been placed permanently on hold by environmental regulators, but moved forward after the sale. The series of events led to widespread speculation that environmental violations may have been used as a bargaining chip in the deal. Sakhalin-II consists of two 800-km pipelines running from the northeast of the island to Prigorodnoye (Prigorodnoe) in Aniva Bay at the southern end. The consortium built Russia's first liquefied natural gas (LNG) plant at Prigorodnoye. Industry sources speculated that "some in Russia hope to sell China gas from Sakhalin-2's or other facilities' future LNG holdings now that it has mastered the technology".

In December 2003, CNPC and Sakhalin Energy signed a frame agreement on exploration and development in Russia's Sakhalin oilfield. ExxonMobil also looked towards the Chinese market, making preliminary agreements on supplying Sakhalin-I gas to China as early as 2002. On November 2, 2004, CNPC began negotiations with ExxonMobil for possible long-term gas deliveries from Sakhalin-1. Negotiations were then concluded in October 2006, when Exxon and CNPC officially announced an agreement. Under the deal, Sakhalin-1 could sell up to 10 billion cubic meters of gas to China over 20 years by pipeline. The plan met strong opposition from Gazprom, which has a rival pipeline project and controls all Russian gas exports apart from sales through PSAs such as Sakhalin-1. In August 2006, Sakhalin-I's De-Kastri oil terminal began exporting processed petroleum to markets including China, Japan, and South Korea.

The influence of Russia's regional energy trade has led to a sense of local uneasiness about foreign countries' influence in the sector. In 2000, President Putin warned a Siberian audience that unless Russia intensified the region's development, the Russian Far East would end up speaking Chinese, Japanese and Korean. In 2002, the Deputy Secretary of the Russian Security Council, Vladimir Potapov, expressed serious concerns about the region's combined remoteness, weak infrastructure, declining population, and wealth "in very diverse resources". Political figures like Viktor Ozerov, Chairman of the Federation Council's Defense and Security Committee, warned of military threats in the Far East and decried the predatory use of the region's resources, and large-scale illegal immigration, though scholars pointed out that no imminent threat was visible. Dmitri Trenin stated that, 'the principal domestic reason is the situation of eastern Russia, especially East Siberia and the Russian Far East. Since the collapse of the Soviet Union, the territories have been going through a deep crisis. The former model of their development is inapplicable; a new model is yet to be devised and implemented. Meanwhile, the vast region has been going through depopulation, deindustrialization, and general degradation. ... The quality of Moscow's statesmanship will be tested by whether it can rise up to the challenge in the East." The RFE has been one of the most difficult areas to transition between the structure of the Soviet Union and the still developing Russian state due to the lack of economic self-sufficiency in the region or any prospects of stable growth.

In September 2005, the Minister of Economic Development and Trade German Gref promised a doubling of state support for the RFE to $612 million in 2006, and the consideration of allocating a new $2.5 billion infrastructure fund for projects in the region. A year later, at the end of 2006, Putin reiterated that the socio-economic isolation of the RFE represented a threat to national security, and advocated yet another new socioeconomic commission and regional development strategy to be formed. He specifically pointed to the perceived threat of foreign immigration in the Far East. Scholars and regional experts have suggested that China's rapid economic growth (especially relative to Russia's GDP growth rate) lies at the root of anxieties concerning the RFE. While the Russian and Chinese economies were roughly the same size in 1993, China's grew to over 3.5 times larger than Russia's by 2008. Even since 1998, when Russia began a rapid economic recovery, China has grown at a faster rate; the gap has only widened since the global economic crisis and falling energy prices of the late 2000s. China's growth has led to the creation of new productive capacity, whereas Russia's recovery has been based largely on reutilizing Soviet-era capacity that had idled in the early 1990s.

Russian officials have repeatedly reiterated their opposition to being merely China's natural resources storehouse. As early as 2001, Deputy Prime Minister and Finance Minister Aleksei Kudrin warned that if Russia failed to become "a worthy economic partner" for Asia and the Pacific Rim, "China and the Southeast Asian countries will steamroll Siberia and the Far East." At the start of his presidency in September 2008, Dmitri Medvedev echoed similar concerns, warning a Kamchatka audience that if Russia fails to develop the RFE, it could turn into a raw material base for more developed Asian countries and "unless we speed up our efforts, we can lose everything." Regional experts have pointed out that despite these increasingly vocal concerns, the local economy of the RFE has become increasingly reliant on Chinese goods, services, and labor over the past decade; furthermore, local out-migration shows little sign of reversing. For all the early promises under Putin, Moscow's policy towards the RFE has not seemed effective as of 2008.

Dmitri Trenin of the Moscow branch of the Carnegie Endowment has argued that Siberia's development could become Russia's most urgent challenge. Failure to develop the region into more than a raw material outpost could lead to what he calls a "Chinese takeover of the region, not by migration but rather by economic means of trade and tourism."

Russia's plans for this region have revolved around building energy infrastructure to leverage exports and attracting investment so that the capital will be available for modernizing regional infrastructure. These plans largely depend on foreign investments, which Russian companies have grudgingly acknowledged. In 2008, a consortium of Chinese engineering firms led by Harbin Turbine signed an agreement with Russian power producer OGK to produce coal-fired turbines in the RFE, adding 41,000 megawatts of new generating capacity by 2011. Stanislav Nevynitsyn, executive director of OGK, admitted, "It is simply a necessity for us to work with the Chinese – we will not get the capacity built otherwise." Through loans to Russia's Bank for Development and Foreign Economic Affairs, Vnesheconombank (VEB), China became a major stockholder in Lukoil in 2009. In the same year, after having excluded foreign firms from bidding on the huge Udokan copper mine in Southeast Siberia, Moscow welcomed Chinese, South Korean, and Kazakh miners and refiners back into the bidding process.

As part of the 'Russia's Energy Strategy till 2020' program, the Russian government launched a program of creating a unified gas production, transportation, and supply system in Eastern Siberia and the RFE in 2006. The program would ultimately provide affirmation of an all-Russia gas system from the Baltic Sea up to the Pacific Ocean." Russian policymakers have also suggested building an international center for spent fuel and nuclear energy in the RFE, hoping to raise the profile in the export of nuclear energy to the global market.

In 2009, Gazprom was awarded subsurface licenses for the Kirinsky, Vostochno-Odoptinsky and Ayashsky blocks to begin the Sakhalin-III project. Geological exploration has been underway at the Kirinskoye field and, as of 2009, natural gas production is scheduled for 2014. The field will become one of the natural gas sources for the Sakhalin–Khabarovsk–Vladivostok gas transmission system (GTS). The first GTS start-up complex will be 1,350 km, with a capacity of 6 billion cubic meters (bcm) per year.

Central Asia
China and Russia generally cooperate with each other regarding Central Asia affairs. While they sometimes compete in Central Asia, those competitions are typically focused on economic matters and proceed in an orderly way within established norms. Where competition in Central Asia does occur between the two powers, it typically arises as a product of the circumstances rather than as an intentional effort to contain the other country.

In 1996, China, Kazakhstan, Kyrgyzstan, Russia and Tajikistan formed the Shanghai Five, a collaborative body that was renamed the Shanghai Cooperation Organisation (SCO) with the addition of Uzbekistan in 2001. As members of the SCO, China and Russia have cooperated in military exercises, such as counterterrorism drills in Kyrgyzstan in 2002 and similar exercises in Kazakhstan and China in 2003.

Russian and Chinese leaders regularly call for greater cooperation and coordination through the SCO between their two countries in the context of their broader goal of promoting multilateral diplomacy. In a joint statement issued on May 23, 2008, Russia and China asserted that “International security is comprehensive and inalienable, and some countries’ security cannot be guaranteed at the cost of some others’, including expanding military and political allies.” Zhao Huasheng, Director of Russian and Central Asian Studies at Fudan University's Shanghai Cooperation Center, has argued that economic cooperation will ensure the long-term relevance of the SCO, as current security threats recede. While China and Russia do enjoy some bilateral energy cooperation, which experts predict will continue to grow in the future, the two countries have emerged as rivals for Central Asian oil and gas supplies. With the rising oil prices in the mid-2000s, Russia has sought to renew its influence in Central Asia, in particular the region's southern flank, to guarantee access to gas supplies for reexport to Europe and for its own domestic needs. As China's energy needs have grown and its policymakers have sought to develop its western provinces, China, too, has sought to expand its influence in Central Asia.

In 2007, at a meeting of SCO prime ministers in Tashkent, Russian Premier Viktor Zubkov reiterated Moscow's desire to forge a Central Asian energy "club" within the SCO, comprising Russia, China, Kazakhstan, Kyrgyzstan, Tajikistan and Uzbekistan. The SCO energy club could be set up as soon as 2008, Russian Deputy Industry and Energy Minister Ivan Materov announced in Tashkent. Materov insisted, however, that the club would not amount to a sort of mini-OPEC. Political and economic analysts in Moscow believe the Kremlin is keen to establish an energy club as a means to prevent a possible clash with China over Central Asia's energy resources.

At a May 2007 SCO summit in Turkmenbashi,  Russian, Kazakh and Turkmen leaders announced the expansion of the Prikaspiisky gas pipeline from Turkmenistan into Russia. The plan has stalled due to several obstacles, including price disagreements and the economic recession of the late 2000s.

Uncertainty over the Prikaspiisky route has given China an opening into the region, especially in Turkmenistan. During a brief visit to Ashgabat, Chinese Premier Wen Jiabao called for efforts "to step up bilateral trade cooperation to a new level." Berdymukhamedov, in turn, expressed interest in "working closely" with China on a natural gas pipeline project, Xinhua News Agency reported. In December 2005, Kazakhstani President Nursultan Nazarbayev inaugurated the Atasu-Alashankou pipeline to ship oil to China. The $800 million Atasu-Alashankou route still needs Russian crude oil from Western Siberia, transported via the Omsk-Pavlodar-Shymkent pipeline, to reach its full annual capacity of 20 million tons by 2010. Although China and its Central Asian partners view their expanding cooperation as a means of diversifying their energy partnerships, Russia has enjoyed success in other major energy projects. In November 2007, two Russian companies (TNK-BP and GazpromNeft) signed an agreement with KazTransOil to ship up to 5 million tons of oil annually to China via the Omsk-Pavlodar-Atasu-Alanshakou pipeline. In the first quarter of 2008, 300,000 tons of Russian crude oil were exported to China along this route. Moreover, a Russian engineering company, Stroytransgaz, won a tender to build Turkmenistan's section of the gas pipeline to China.

China and Russia announced in May 2014 that they had reached a 30-year gas deal where "Russia would supply 38 billion cubic meters of natural gas each year to China". These developments continue to show Russia and China's attempts to work together outside of USA confinements.

Military relations

After the EU arms embargo on China imposed as a consequence of the Tiananmen Square protests of 1989, China became a reliable client for Russian military exports, making up 25–50% of all foreign military sales. On November 9, 1993, Russian Defence Minister Pavel Grachev and Chinese Defence Minister Chi Haotian signed a five-year defense cooperation agreement paving the way for an increase in the number of military attachés stationed in their respective capitals. On July 12, 1994, the Russian and Chinese defence ministers signed a border security agreement designed to prevent potentially dangerous military incidents, such as unintentional radar jamming and airspace violations. In December 1996, Russia finalized "the sale of SU-27 fighters and related production technology to China."

On October 19, 1999, Defence Minister of China, General Chi Haotian, after meeting with Syrian Defence Minister Mustafa Tlass in Damascus, Syria to discuss expanding military ties between Syria and China, flew directly to Israel and met with Ehud Barak, the then Prime Minister and Defence Minister of Israel where they discussed military relations. Among the military arrangements was a $1 billion Israeli-Russian sale of military aircraft to China, which were to be jointly produced by Russia and Israel.

In 2004, the Russian Foreign Ministry blocked both the sale of the Su-35 and Tupolev Tu-22M bombers to China over concerns about the arrangements for Chinese production of the Sukhoi Su-27SK (known as the Shenyang J-11). Originally, the licensing agreement required that engines and avionics be sourced by Russian suppliers; however, by 2004 these components were being produced domestically.

Currently, China focuses on domestic weapon designs and manufacturing, while still importing certain military products from Russia, such as jet engines. China sought to become independent in its defence sector and become competitive in global arms markets; its defence sector is rapidly developing and maturing. Gaps in certain capabilities remain, including development of electronic and reliable propulsion systems, although China's defense industry production has improved significantly, providing an advantage over other militaries in the Asia-Pacific region. China's 2015 Defense White Paper called for "independent innovation" and the "sustainable development" of advanced weaponry and equipment.

In September 2018, Russia hosted the militaries of China and Mongolia as a part of the Vostok 2018 military exercise to improve ties between the countries, making them the first two countries outside of the former Soviet Union to join the exercise.

In December 2019, Rostec officials accused China of intellectual property theft of a range of military technologies. In June 2020, Russia charged one of its Arctic scientists of passing sensitive information to China.

In July 2019, and again in December 2020, Russia and China flew joint bomber patrols over the Pacific.

In November 2022, Russian and Chinese warplanes including the Tupolev-95 and XIAN H-6K long range strategic bombers conducted joint patrols over the Sea of Japan and East China sea.

As early as February 2022, according to US authorities, Russia asked China for advanced military weaponry, in particular, armed drones for use in their invasion of Ukraine. China and Russia have both denied these allegations.

In September 2022, Russia hosted the military of China as a part of the  military exercise.

Media communication agreements
In March 2013, the Voice of Russia and the People's Daily Online signed a news sharing agreement as Xi and Putin presided. On October 13, 2014, Russia Today and the People's Daily signed a cooperation agreement. In July 2021, the Russian-Chinese Commission for Humanitarian Cooperation agreed to mass-media cooperation.

Mutual perceptions
Since 1995, Russians have consistently held positive views of China. As of September 2022, 88% of Russians surveyed by the Levada Center view China favorably, with only 5% expressing a negative opinion. 

According to a 2017 BBC World Service poll, 74% of the Chinese view Russia's influence positively, with 18% expressing a negative view, while 44% of Russians view China's influence positively and 23% negatively. 

According to a 2019 survey by the Pew Research Center, 71% of Russians have a favorable view of China, with 18% expressing an unfavorable view. A YouGov survey conducted in the same year found that 71% of the Chinese think Russia has a positive effect on world affairs, while 15% view it negatively.

During the 2022 Russian invasion of Ukraine, many social media users in China showed sympathy for Russian narratives due in part to distrust of US foreign policy. Chinese company NetEase has published videos critical of Russia from Chinese in Ukraine and Ukrainians in China.

According to a Genron NPO poll released in November 2022 asking about Chinese peoples' views on the Russian invasion, 39.5% of respondents said the Russian actions "are not wrong", 21.5% said "the Russian actions are a violation of the U.N. Charter and international laws, and should be opposed", and 29% said "the Russian actions are wrong, but the circumstances should be considered."

See also

 Foreign relations of China
 Foreign relations of Russia
 Embassy of China, Moscow
 Ambassadors of China to Russia
 Ambassadors of Russia to China
 China–Soviet Union relations
 Russia–Taiwan relations
 History of Sino-Russian relations
 Russia's turn to the East

Notes

References

Further reading

 Bernstein, Thomas P. and Hua-Yu Li, eds. China Learns from the Soviet Union, 1949–Present (2010).
 Blank, Stephen. "Is Russia a great power in Asia?." in Great Powers and Geopolitics (Springer, Cham, 2015) pp. 161–182. online
 Blank, Stephen. "Russo-Chinese relations in strategic perspective." in International Relations and Asia's Northern Tier (Palgrave, Singapore, 2018) pp. 93–108.
 Blank, Stephen, and Younkyoo Kim. "Does Russo-Chinese partnership threaten America's interests in Asia?." Orbis 60.1 (2016): 112–127.
 Contessi, Nicola P. "China, Russia and the Leadership of the SCO: A Tacit Deal Scenario" China and Eurasia Forum Quarterly 8, 4 (2010): 101–123.
 Efremenko D. "New Russian Government's Foreign Policy towards East Asia and the Pacific" Journal of East Asian Affairs (2012) 26#2 (Seoul: Institute for National Security ) metaCode=en_m_pub&boardId=a57b3ef8b2bff73bb9e00084&pkey=1 online
 Fravel, M. Taylor. Active Defense: China's Military Strategy since 1949 (Princeton University Press, 2019) online reviews
 Garver, John W. Foreign relations of the People's Republic of China (1992) online
 Herbst, John. "The Coming Russian-Chinese Clash" The National Interest Aug. 21, 2020.
 Hsu, Jing-Yun, and Jenn-Jaw Soong. "Development of China-Russia Relations (1949–2011) Limits, Opportunities, and Economic Ties." Chinese economy 47.3 (2014): 70–87. online
 Jersild, Austin.  The Sino-Soviet Alliance: An International History (U of North Carolina Press, 2014).
 Kim, Younkyoo, and Stephen Blank. "Rethinking Russo-Chinese Relations in Asia: Beyond Russia's Chinese Dilemma." China: An International Journal(2013) 11#3 pp: 136–148. online
 
 Korolev, Alexander. "The Strategic Alignment between Russia and China: Myths and Reality." Singapore: Lee Kuan Yew School of Public Policy Research Paper #15–19 (2015). online
 Kuliabin A. Semine S. Russia — a counterbalancing agent to the Asia. Zavtra Rossii, #28, 17 July 1997. RUSSIA IN THE PACIFIC REGION SYSTEM:
 March, G. Patrick. Eastern Destiny: Russia in Asia and the North Pacific (1996) online
 Marsh, Christopher. Unparalleled Reforms. China's Rise, Russia's Fall and the Interdependence of Transition (2005).
 Maxwell. Neville. "How the Sino-Russian boundary conflict was finally settled: From Nerchinsk 1689 to Vladivostok 2005 via Zhenbao Island 1969." Critical Asian Studies 39.2 (2007): 229–253. online
 Moshes, Arkady and Matti Nojonen, eds. Russia-China relations: Current state, alternative futures, and implications for the West  FIIA Report 30, The Finnish Institute of International Affairs (September 2011)
 Nye, Joseph. "A New Sino-Russian Alliance?" Project Syndicate 12 January 2015
 Quested, Rosemary K.I. Sino-Russian relations: a short history (Routledge, 2014) online
 Rozman, Gilbert. The Sino-Russian Challenge to the World Order: National Identities, Bilateral Relations, and East versus West in the 2010s (2014) online review
 Rozman, Gilbert. The Chinese Debate about Soviet Socialism, 1978–1985 (Princeton UP, 1987).
 Rozman, Gilbert and Sergey Radchenko, eds. International Relations and Asia's Northern Tier (Palgrave, Singapore, 2018)  excerpt
 Shen, Zhihua. A Short History of Sino-Soviet Relations, 1917–1991 (Springer Singapore;Palgrave Macmillan, 2020)
 Tian, Hao. "Sino-Russian Relations: Conflict and Cooperation." (Lehigh University, 2016), bibliography pp 55–60; online
 Trenin, Dmitri. Challenges and Opportunities: Russia and the Rise of China and India  in Strategic Asia 2011–12: Asia Responds to Its Rising Powers – China and India (September 2011)
 Urbansky, Sören. Beyond the Steppe Frontier: A History of the Sino-Russian Border (2020) a comprehensive history; excerpt
 Weitz, Richard. China-Russia security relations: strategic parallelism without partnership or passion? (Maroon Ebooks, 2015)
 Wishnick, Elizabeth. Mending Fences. The Evolution of Moscow's China Policy from Brezhnev to Yeltsin (2001)
 Zubok, Vladislav. "The Soviet Union and China in the 1980s: reconciliation and divorce." Cold War History 17.2 (2017): 121–141.

 
Russia
Bilateral relations of Russia